Rectortown is an unincorporated community in Fauquier County, Virginia.

The Rectortown Historic District was listed on the National Register of Historic Places in 2004.

References

Unincorporated communities in Virginia
Unincorporated communities in Fauquier County, Virginia